The Shifting Heart is a play written in 1957 in Australia by Richard Beynon, it is an insight to the psychology of racism and its victims. In the background of 1950s Collingwood, Melbourne.

Characters 

 Momma Bianchi
 Poppa Bianchi
 Gino Bianchi
 Maria Bianchi (Fowler)
 Clarry Fowler
 Leila Pratt
 Donny Pratt
 Detective-Sergeant Lukie

Setting 
The Shifting Heart is set in 1956, Collingwood, Melbourne on Christmas Eve. At the time, Collingwood was a poor suburb populated by lower class Australian families and Italian immigrants.

The play published in 1960 by Angus & Robertson begins with two pages of stage direction. It describes the home of Italians Mr. & Mrs. Vicenzo Bianchi, the stage is their backyard. On stage left there is a large garbage can that is overfilled, the overflow is in a small household bucket. On each side of the stage is the wall of the neighbours.

On stage left is the wall between the Pratt family, Leila and Donny. The wall is a fence that relaxes in the wind and shows an air of dilapidation. The boards are able to be pushed apart enough to let the Pratts enter the Bianchis' backyard.

On stage right there is a wall described as a formidable barrier, complete with a length of barbed wire across the top. It is low enough for the woman living there to toss garbage over. In the first pages of dialog and notes in the stage direction, it is clear that there is a "war" going on between the family living stage right against the Bianchis because they are Italian. The Pratt family is on the side of the Bianchi family.

Productions
The Shifting Heart premiered at the Elizabethan Theatre in Sydney in October 1957, presented by the Australian Elizabethan Theatre Trust. It toured nationally for a year, including seasons at the Comedy Theatre in Melbourne and Her Majesty's Theatre in Brisbane.

The play debuted in England in 1959 where it played a West End season at the Duke of York's Theatre.

The ABC made a radio version of the play in 1962.  It was adapted for Australian television on the ABC in 1968.

Notable revivals include those of Melbourne's Union Theatre Repertory Company in 1962, Sydney's Marian Street Theatre in 1981, Sydney's Phillip Street Theatre in 1984, and the State Theatre Company of South Australia in 1996.

1962 TV adaptation
The play was filmed by British TV in 1962.

It screened for the General Motors Hour in Australia on 1 September 1962.

Cast
 June Brunell as Maria
 Lewis Flander as Gino Bianchi
 John Lee as Det.-Sgt Lukie
 Reg Lye as Donny Pratt
 Keith Michell as Clarry
 Victor Platt as Poppa Bianchi
 Madge Ryan as Leila Pratt
 Gillian Webb as Momma Bianchi

1968 TV adaptation
The play was filmed for TV in 1968 and aired on 21 August 1968 (Melbourne) as part of Wednesday Theatre. It starred Anne Charleston and Tom Oliver, who later worked together on the TV series Neighbours.

It also starred Madge Ryan who had appeared in the premiere season of the play, only then she played Leila the neighbour and now she played Momma.

Cast
 Madge Ryan as Momma
 Alan Bickford as Gino
 Tom Oliver as Clarrie
 Anne Charleston as Maria
 Syd Conabere as Poppa
 Penny Shelton as Leila
 Terry Norris as Donny
 Blair Edgar as Lukie
 Berys Marsh

Reception
The Age said "the entirety works despite some stray accents."

References

External links
 
  (subscription required)
 
 Original theatre program at The Trust

1957 plays
1950s Australian plays
Fiction set in 1956
Melbourne in fiction
1968 television plays
Angus & Robertson books